Rosiclare is a city in Hardin County, Illinois, along the Ohio River. The population was 1,160 at the 2010 census, down from 1,213 at the 2000 census.

History
Some of the earliest settlers of the Rosicare area were outlaws mainly counterfeiters from the Sturdivant Gang in the late 1810s-early 1820s. Rosiclare used to be the fluorite capital of the United States. Andrew Jackson, in 1835, once owned a fluorspar mine in Rosiclare. Wholesale mining of fluorspar first began in Rosiclare in 1842. Mining ceased when it became cheaper to import fluorite from China. The Lead and Fluorspar Mining Company continued to process ore from mines in Hardin County but closed due to foreign competition in 1996.

Geography
Rosiclare is located in southwestern Hardin County at  (37.424869, -88.345810). It is bordered to the southeast by the Ohio River, which forms the state boundary with Kentucky. Illinois Route 34 terminates in Rosiclare at the river and leads north  to Harrisburg.

Climate

Demographics

As of the census of 2000, there were 1,213 people, 512 households, and 328 families residing in the city. The racial makeup of the city was 97.77% White, 0.49% African American, 0.08% Native American, 0.33% Asian, 0.33% Pacific Islander, 0.41% from other races, and 0.58% from two or more races. Hispanic or Latino of any race were 1.15% of the population.

There were 512 households, out of which 29.3% had children under the age of 18 living with them, 50.2% were married couples living together, 11.5% had a female householder with no husband present, and 35.9% were non-families. 32.2% of all households were made up of individuals, and 18.2% had someone living alone who was 65 years of age or older.  The average household size was 2.23 and the average family size was 2.82.

In the city, the population was spread out, with 21.4% under the age of 18, 8.5% from 18 to 24, 23.8% from 25 to 44, 23.0% from 45 to 64, and 23.3% who were 65 years of age or older.  The median age was 42 years. For every 100 females, there were 83.2 males.  For every 100 females age 18 and over, there were 82.1 males.

The median income for a household in the city was $22,600, and the median income for a family was $32,279. Males had a median income of $26,429 versus $15,417 for females. The per capita income for the city was $15,398.  About 17.6% of families and 22.5% of the population were below the poverty line, including 31.3% of those under age 18 and 19.2% of those age 65 or over.

Notable people 

 Jennifer Rhodes, television and film actress
 The Sturdivant Gang, 19th century counterfeiters

See also
List of cities and towns along the Ohio River

References

Cities in Hardin County, Illinois
Cities in Illinois
Illinois populated places on the Ohio River